"The Way I Am" is a song written by Ingrid Michaelson on her album Girls and Boys.

On September 21, 2007, Michaelson made her network television debut performing the song on Last Call with Carson Daly.

Caroline Pennell sang the song on the fifth season of The Voice in the knockout rounds, winning widespread fame, and was deemed the front runner of the show with her performance.

American Idol Season 9 finalist Didi Benami performed a cover of the song on the Top 12 female performances on Tuesday, February 23, 2010.

The song is frequently used to demonstrate Bose Corporation products due to its deep bass and crisp vocals.

Music video
The song's music video was directed by Autumn de Wilde.  It depicts Michaelson dancing with a man (played by Greg Laswell, whom Michaelson would later marry) in a gymnasium where everyone present, except for Michaelson, is a clown or mime.  Other dancers glare at Michaelson and she runs from the dance to a bathroom, where she uses lipstick to give her reflection the appearance of a clown nose, and then labels herself a "freak."  Her dance partner, a clown, has followed her and embraces her when she emerges from the bathroom.  They share a kiss and leave together.

Chart performance
The song debuted on the Billboard Hot 100 at #80 on October 4, 2007, and peaked at #37. The single benefited from the exposure through its use in a national television ad campaign for Old Navy sweaters.  On the Canadian Hot 100, "The Way I Am" peaked at #51. It has been certified Platinum by the RIAA and has sold 1.6 million copies in the United States.

Charts

Year-end charts

References

2007 debut singles
Songs written by Ingrid Michaelson
Ingrid Michaelson songs
2006 songs